Kumba is a genus of rattails.

Species
There are currently eight recognized species in this genus:
 Kumba calvifrons Iwamoto & Sazonov, 1994
 Kumba dentoni N. B. Marshall, 1973
 Kumba gymnorhynchus Iwamoto & Sazonov, 1994
 Kumba hebetata (C. H. Gilbert, 1905)
 Kumba japonica (Matsubara, 1943)
 Kumba maculisquama (Trunov, 1981)
 Kumba musorstom Merrett & Iwamoto, 2000
 Kumba punctulata Iwamoto & Sazonov, 1994

References

Macrouridae
Taxa named by Norman Bertram Marshall